Kollijah (also Romanized as Kollījah) is a village in Razan Rural District, in the Central District of Razan County, Hamadan Province, Iran. At the 2006 census, its population was 171, in 42 families.

References 

Populated places in Razan County